Kei Nishikori was the defending champion, but chose not to participate this year.

In the final, Mardy Fish defeated Evgeny Korolev, 7–5, 6–3.

Seeds

Draw

Finals

Top half

Bottom half

Qualifying

Seeds

Qualifiers

Draw

First qualifier

Second qualifier

Third qualifier

Fourth qualifier

External links
Main Draw
Qualifying draw
Main Draw on ATP Site

Singles